Orthogonius andrewesi is a species of ground beetle in the subfamily Orthogoniinae. It was described by Emden in 1928.

References

andrewesi
Beetles described in 1928